Jeff Small (born 1973) is an American film studio executive who is the chief executive officer and president of Amblin Partners and DreamWorks Pictures.

He is a native of Marietta, Georgia and graduated from Stanford University.

Small was previously an executive with the Walt Disney Motion Pictures Group and with Universal Studios who played key roles in mergers & acquisitions including of Polygram and the USA Network. Subsequently he transferred to Universal Pictures, where he was director of business development. In 2000 he joined Revolution Studios, eventually serving as chief operating officer.

References

 http://www.prnewswire.com/cgi-bin/stories.pl?ACCT=109&STORY=/www/story/11-06-2006/0004468091&EDATE=

1973 births
Living people
American film studio executives
Businesspeople from Atlanta
Businesspeople from Los Angeles
Stanford University alumni
American chief operating officers
American chief executives
21st-century American businesspeople